Alexei Bychenko (born 5 February 1988) is a retired Ukrainian-born Israeli figure skater. He represented Ukraine through 2009 and Israel after that. He is the 2016 European Figure Skating Championships silver medalist and 2016 Rostelecom Cup bronze medalist. He is the first Israeli skater to medal at the European Championships. He placed fourth at 2018 Worlds. Bychenko competed for Israel at the 2014, 2018, and 2022 Winter Olympics.

Early and personal life
Bychenko was born in Kyiv, Ukraine, and is Jewish. He studied at National Pedagogical Dragomanov University, in Kyiv. His mother is of Jewish descent, and he became an Israeli citizen and in 2010 began representing Israel in competitions.

Career 
Bychenko began skating in 1993.

For Ukraine 
Representing Ukraine, Bychenko debuted on the ISU Junior Grand Prix (JGP) series in the 2003–04 season. His senior international debut took place in late September 2005 at Skate Israel, but he continued occasionally appearing on the junior level. He achieved his best JGP result, 8th, in October 2006 in Taipei, at his final junior event.

Bychenko became a two-time (2007, 2008) Ukrainian national silver medalist on the senior level. His final international appearance for Ukraine came in late November 2009 at the Crystal Skate of Romania.

For Israel 
His coaches are Roman Serov, Nikolai Morozov, and Galit Chait Moracci, and his choreographer is Galit Chait Moracci. He trains in Hackensack, New Jersey.

Bychenko first appeared internationally for Israel at the Golden Spin of Zagreb in December 2011. He qualified for the final segment at the 2012 European Championships in Sheffield and went on to finish 22nd overall. At the 2012 World Championships in Nice, he did not advance past the short program.

At the 2013 Nebelhorn Trophy, Bychenko qualified a spot for Israel in the men's event at the 2014 Winter Olympics.

He finished 21st competing for Israel at the 2014 Winter Olympics in Sochi, Russia.

Bychenko received his first Grand Prix invitations in the 2014–15 season. He finished fourth at the 2015 European Championships in Stockholm after placing seventh in the short program and fourth in the free skate.

At the 2016 European Championships in Bratislava, Bychenko placed fourth in both segments and edged out Russia's Maxim Kovtun for a silver medal by a margin of 0.35. It was Israel's first European figure skating medal.

In the 2016–17 season, Bychenko won bronze at a Grand Prix assignment, the 2016 Rostelecom Cup, and gold at a Challenger Series event, the Golden Spin of Zagreb. He ranked third in the short program, 9th in the free skate, and 5th overall at the 2017 European Championships in Ostrava, Czech Republic. In March, he placed 11th in the short, 12th in the free, and 10th overall at the 2017 World Championships in Helsinki, Finland.  Due to his result, Israel qualified two spots in the men's event at the 2018 Winter Olympics in Pyeongchang, South Korea.

Bychenko competed for Israel at the 2018 Winter Olympics in Men's Single Figure Skating in Pyeongchang, South Korea, and served as Israel's flag bearer at the opening ceremonies. Bychenko finished the men’s figure skating competition in 11th place overall, Israel's best result at the Games, bettering Israeli figure skater Michael Shmerkin’s 16th-place finish 24 years prior. He also came in second in the Men's Single Short Program, as part of the team event, as the Israeli team came in 8th.

Bychenko was named to Israeli team for the 2022 Winter Olympics, and finished twenty-sixth in the men's event.

It was announced that Bychenko had decided to retire from competition on May 24, 2022.

Programs

Results 

GP: Grand Prix; CS: Challenger Series; JGP: Junior Grand Prix

For Israel

For Ukraine

Detailed results
Small medals for short and free programs awarded only at ISU Championships. At team events, medals awarded for team results only.

References

External links

 
 

Israeli male single skaters
Ukrainian male single skaters
Figure skaters at the 2007 Winter Universiade
Living people
1988 births
Sportspeople from Kyiv
Figure skaters at the 2014 Winter Olympics
Figure skaters at the 2018 Winter Olympics
Ukrainian emigrants to Israel
Ukrainian people of Israeli descent
Naturalized citizens of Israel
Olympic figure skaters of Israel
Sportspeople from Hackensack, New Jersey
Jewish Israeli sportspeople
Jewish Ukrainian sportspeople
European Figure Skating Championships medalists
Figure skaters at the 2022 Winter Olympics